Mike Sheppard may refer to:
 Mike Sheppard (American football), American football coach
 Mike Sheppard (baseball), American college baseball coach
 Mike Sheppard (rugby union), Canadian rugby union player

See also
 H. Michael Shepard, American cancer researcher